Bhairava (Sanskrit: भैरव ) or Kala Bhairava is a Shaivite and Vajrayāna deity worshiped by Hindus and Buddhists. In Shaivism, he is a powerful manifestation, or avatar, of Shiva associated with annihilation. In Trika system Bhairava represents Supreme Reality, synonymous to Para Brahman. Generally in Hinduism, Bhairava is also called Dandapani ("[he who holds the] Danda in [his] hand"), as he holds a rod or Danda to punish sinners, and Svaśva, meaning "whose vehicle is a dog". In Vajrayana Buddhism, he is considered a fierce emanation of boddhisatva Mañjuśrī, and also called Heruka, Vajrabhairava, and Yamantaka.

He is worshiped throughout India, Nepal, Indonesia, Sri Lanka and Japan as well as in Tibetan Buddhism.

Etymology 
Bhairava originates from the word bhīru, which means "fearsome". Bhairava means "terribly fearsome form". It is also known as one who destroys fear or one who is beyond fear. One interpretation is that he protects his devotees from dreadful enemies, greed, lust, and anger. These enemies are dangerous as they never allow humans to seek God within. There is also another interpretation: Bha means creation, ra means sustenance and va means destruction. Therefore, Bhairava is the one who creates, sustains and dissolves the three stages of life. Therefore, he becomes the ultimate or the supreme.

Hinduism

Legend 

The origin of Bhairava is traced back to a conversation between Brahma and Vishnu which is recounted in the Shiva Puranam. In it, Vishnu inquired of Brahma, "Who is the supreme creator of the Universe?"  Arrogantly, Brahma told Vishnu to worship him as Supreme Creator. One day, Brahma thought "I have five heads. Shiva also has five heads. I can do everything that Shiva does and therefore I am Shiva." Brahma became a little egotistical as a result of this. Additionally, he began to forget the work of Shiva and also started interfering in what Shiva was supposed to be doing. Consequently, Shiva threw a small hair from his head which assumed the form of Kala Bhairava and casually went to cut off one of Brahma's heads. The skull (kapala) of Brahma is held in the hands of Kala Bhairava, Brahma's ego was destroyed and he became enlightened. From then on, he became useful to himself and to the world, and deeply grateful to Shiva. In the form of the Kala Bhairava, Shiva is said to be guarding each of these Shakti Pitha (Shakti temples). Each Shakti Pitha is accompanied by a temple dedicated to Bhairava.

There is another school of thought that states that Shiva himself created Bhairava. It states that there was once an asura named Dahurāsura, who got a boon that he could be killed only by a woman. Parvati took the form of Kali to kill him. The wrath of Kali killed the asura.  After killing the asura, her wrath metamorphosed as a child. Kali fed the child with her milk.  Shiva made both Kali and the child to merge with him.  From this merged form of Shiva, Bhairava appeared in his eight forms (Aṣṭāṅga Bhairavas). Since Bhairava was thus created by Shiva, he is said to be one of the sons of Shiva.

The Puranas also give a version of Bhairava. In this version there was a war between devas and asuras. To eradicate the asuras, Shiva created Kala Bhairava from whom Aṣṭāṅga Bhairavas were created. These Ashta Bhairavas married Ashta Matrikas. These Ashta Bhairavas and Ashta Matrikas have dreadful forms. From these Ashta Bhairavas and Ashta Matrikas, 64 Bhairavas and 64 Yoginis were created.

Depiction 
Normally in Shiva temples, idols of Bhairava are situated in the north, facing Western direction. He is also called Kṣhetrapāla. He appears in a standing position with four hands. His weapons are drum, pāśa (noose), trident and skull. In some forms of Bhairava, there are more than four hands. He appears with a dog. His weapons, the dog, protruding teeth, terrifying looks, and a garland with red flowers all give him a frightening appearance.

In all Shiva temples, regular puja (reverence) rituals begin with Surya and end with Bhairava. Devotees offer what is understood to be favored by Bhairava: a ghee bath (abhiṣeka), red flowers, ghee lamp, unbroken coconut, honey, boiled food, fibrous fruits etc. If a Bhairava idol is facing west, it is good; facing south is moderate; facing east is not good. The right time to pray to Bhairavi is midnight. At midnight it is said that Bhairava and his consort Bhairavi will give darśana (appearance) to their devotees. The most appropriate time is a Friday midnight. There are eight types of flowers and leaves used in archana (अर्चन) to Bhairava.

In Kashmir Shaivism, Bhairava is the ultimate form of manifestation or pure "I" consciousness.

One of his forms is called Svarṇākarṣṇa Bhairava ; In this form, he has red or blue complexion and is clothed in golden dress. He has the moon over his head. He has four hands, one of which he holds a golden vessel. He gives wealth and prosperity. Performing pūja on Tuesdays gives quick results. In some of the ancient texts he is said to have thirty two hands, the shape of a bird, golden complexion, terrible teeth, and a human form above the hip. Worshipping him destroys enemies.

Some forms of Bhairava are guardians of the eight cardinal points. There are 64 Bhairavas. These 64 Bhairavas are grouped under eight categories and each category is headed by one major Bhairava. The major eight Bhairavas are called Aṣṭāṅga Bhairavas. The Ashta Bhairavas control the eight directions of this universe.  Each Bhairava has seven sub Bhairavas under him, totaling 64 Bhairavas.  All of the Bhairavas are ruled and controlled by Maha Kala Bhairava otherwise known as Kala Bhairava, who is the supreme ruler of time of this universe as per some Śaiva tantric scriptures (āgamas). Bhairavi is the consort of Kala Bhairava. The eight Bhairavas are said to represent five elements viz. ākāś, air, fire, water and earth and the other three being sun, moon and ātman. Each of the eight Bhairavas are different in appearance, have different weapons, different vāhanas (vehicles) and they bless their devotees with eight types of wealth representing Ashta Lakshmis. Continuous worship of Bhairava leads the worshiper to a true Guru. There are separate mantras to all the eight Bhairavas.

Bhairava is also called upon as protector, as he guards the eight directions of the universe. In Shiva temples, when the temple is closed, the keys are placed before Bhairava. Bhairava is also described as the protector of women. He is described as the protector of the timid and in general women who are timid in nature.

It is generally believed that worshiping Bhairava gives prosperity, success and good progeny, prevents premature death and gives solution to debts and liabilities. Different forms of Bhairava evolve only from Śiva, who is called the Mahā Bhairava.

Trika System
Trika and Kashmiri Shaivism names the Absolute Reality (Para Brahman) as Bhairava. The Vijñāna Bhairava Tantra is a key Tantra text of the Trika System. Cast as a discourse between the god Bhairava and his consort Bhairavi it briefly presents 112 Tantric meditation methods or centering techniques (Dharana). The text is a chapter from the Rudrayamala Tantra, a Bhairava Agama. Bhairavi, the goddess, asks Bhairava to reveal the essence of the way to realization of the highest reality. In his answer Bhairava describes 112 ways to enter into the universal and transcendental state of consciousness. References to it appear throughout the literature of Trika, Kashmir Shaivism, indicating that it was considered to be an important text in the schools of Kashmir Shaiva philosophy and Trika.

List of Bhairavas
The list of manifestation of Shiva:

Trisandhyeshvara
Viśveśvara
Bhiruk
Vakranath
Lambkarna
Vamana
Pachali Bhairava
Bagh Bhairava
Varaha (Baraha)
Rudra Mahadev
Bhoothnath Vetal / Betal Bhairava
Chakrapani
Vikritaksh
Vimocanā
Kramadishwar
Chanda
Unmatta Bhairava
Nakuleshwar
Umananda or Bhayaanand
Ruru
Nimish
Abhiru
Sanwart
Ghanteshwar
Ambar
Amar
Sarvanand
Mahodar
Rakshaseshwar (Nayanair)
Kapali
Chandrashekhar
Maharudra
Vakratund
Bhava
Sthanu
Nandikeshwar
Vatsnabh or Dandpani
Krodhish
Bhadrasen
Sambaranand
Sanhar
Trayambak
Tripuresh
Kapilambar
Marthanda
Kala Bhairava
Sarvanand
Amritaksha
Bhishan
Baidyanath
Ksheer Kantak
Batuk Bhairava
Kapalbhairav
Tumbeswar
Jogesh
Shri Khutkuni Bhairava
Shai Bhairava
Matang Bhairava
Swarnakarshan Bhairava
Akshobhya Bhairava
Asitanga Bhairava
Samhaar Bhairava
Kshetrapaala Bhairava
Vikrant Bhairava
Patal Bhairava

Buddhism 

Buddhism also adopted Bhairava (Tibetan: 'Jigs byed; Chinese: Buwei) as a deity and a dharmapala or dharma protector. The various buddhist forms of Bhairava (variously called Herukas, Vajrabhairava, Mahākāla and Yamantaka) are considered fierce deities and yidams (tantric meditational deity) in Tibetan Buddhism. They also have their own set of buddhist tantras, the Vajrabhairava tantras. According to Tibetan tradition, these tantras were revealed to Lalitavajra in Oddiyana in the tenth century. These texts play a particularly important role in the Sarma (new translation) traditions of Tibetan Buddhism, especially among the Gelug school where Vajrabhairava is one of the three central highest yoga tantra practices of the lineage. Because of this, it is also popular in Mongolia as a protector deity and was also popular among the Manchus. The deity is also central to Newar Buddhism. The tantric practices associated with Bhairava focus on the transformation of anger and hatred into understanding.

Worship

Temples or shrines to Bhairava are present within or near most Jyotirlinga temples.  There are also the sacred twelve shrines dedicated to Shiva which can be found all across India including the Kashi Vishwanath Temple, Varanasi and the Kal Bhairava temple, Ujjain. The Patal Bhairava and Vikrant Bhairava shrines are located in Ujjain as well.

One of the ancient temples of Kala Bhairava is situated in Dhuri city (District Sangrur), Punjab. The idol of Kala Bhairava in the temple was found hundreds of years ago. The temple has been managed by "Baba Shri Pritam Muni Ji" for many years. It is believed that Kala Bhairava Ji resides here.

Gorat Kashmiris are known to worship Bhairava during Shivratri. The renowned Hindu reformer, Adi Sankara composed a hymn on Kala Bhairava called "Sri Kalabhairava Ashtakam" in the city of Kashi.

Observances

Bhairava Ashtami, commemorating the day Kala Bhairava appeared on earth, is celebrated on Krishna paksha Ashtami of the Margashirsha month of the Hindu calendar. It is a day filled with special prayers and rituals.

Iconography

Bhairava is depicted as being ornamented with a range of twisted serpents, which serve as earrings, bracelets, anklets, and sacred thread (yajnopavita). He wears a tiger skin and a ritual apron composed of human bones.  Bhairava has a dog (Shvan) as his divine vahana (vehicle). Bhairavi is a fierce and terrifying aspect of the Devi who is virtually indistinguishable from Kali, with the exception of her particular identification as the consort of Bhairava.

Bhairava himself has eight manifestations i.e. Ashta Bhairava:
Asithaanga Bhairava
Ruru Bhairava
Chanda Bhairava
Krodha Bhairava
Unmattha Bhairava
Kapaala Bhairava
Bheeshana Bhairava
Samhaara Bhairava

Kala Bhairava is conceptualized as the Guru-Nath (Teacher and Master) of the planetary deity Shani (Saturn).

Bhairava is known as Bhairavar or Vairavar in Tamil, where he is often presented as a Grama devata or village guardian who safeguards the devotee in eight directions (ettu tikku). Known in Sinhalese as Bahirawa, he is said to protect treasures. Lord Bhairava is the main deity worshiped by the Aghora sect.

Temples

Bhairava is an important deity of the Newars. All the traditional settlements of Newars have at least one temple of Bhairava. Most of the temples of Bhairava in Nepal are maintained by Newar priests. There are several Bhairava temples in the Kathmandu valley.

In south Karnataka, Lord Sri Kalabhairaveshwara is present as Kshetra Palaka in Sri Adichunchanagiri Hills.

Kala Bhairava temples can also be found around Shaktipeeths. It is said that Shiva allocated the job of guarding each of the 52 Shaktipeeths to one Bhairava. There are said to be 52 forms of Bhairava, which are considered a manifestation of Shiva himself.  Traditionally, Kala Bhairava is the Grama devata in the rural villages of Maharashtra, where he is referred to as "Bhairava/Bhairavnath" and "Bairavar". In Karnataka, Lord Bhairava is the supreme God for the Hindu community commonly referred to as Vokkaligas (Gowdas). Especially in the Jogi Vokkaliga, he is considered the caretaker and punisher. Shri Kala Bhairava Nath Swami Temple of Madhya Pradesh is also popular.

Mahakala Bhairava and Agnidurgha.

In Mangalore there is an agnidurga temple at a place called karamogaru near gurupura bridge Karnataka it was believed that nath panth saints where workshiping Lord Shri Mahakala Bhairava and Shri Agnidurgha. Presently Mahakala Bhairava and Agnidurgha has been one of the main deity in Gurupura, Karamogaru prathistapan rituals has been carried out by Sri Sri 1008 Sri Rajyogi Nirmalnathji Maharaj.

See also

 Adichunchanagiri Hills
 Akash Bhairava
 Bhairab Naach
 Muthappan
 Sirkazhi
 Kshetrapala

References

Cited sources

External links

 Shri Kala Bhairava Mandir, New Delhi 

Mythological dogs
Dogs in Hinduism
Forms of Shiva
Hindu tantric deities
Newar
Night gods
Heavenly attendants in Jainism